Filicudi is one of seven islands that make up the Aeolian archipelago, situated  northeast of the island of Sicily, southern Italy.  It is a frazione of the comune of Lipari.

Geography

There are several small villages on the island, which include Pecorini Mare and Valdichiesa. Filicudi's lands are capable of producing wine, olive oil, grain, and vegetables.

At Capo Graziano are the remains of a Bronze Age village dating back to the second millennium BCE.

History

The modern name of "Filicudi" is a corruption of the ancient Greek name for the island, Phoenicusa (Phoenician island).  The island, like the other Aeolian Islands, was settled since the Neolithic Age, around 3000 BCE.  As evidenced by archaeological findings, the island was occupied by a new people during the Bronze Age.  The island was uninhabited for many centuries until occupied by the Greeks.  Roman and Byzantine remains can also be found on the island.

By 1971, the island had 270 residents.  Roughly one-third of them left, however, after May 26 of that year, when Italian police used Filicudi as a place of exile for 18 reputed leaders of the Italian Mafia who were awaiting trial for on charges of organized crime.   By May 31, the remaining residents left in protest, with the exception of the exiles and the police guarding them.  

Since the 1970s Filicudi was rediscovered and populated by photographers and artists such as Sergio Libiszewsky, Ettore Sottsass, novelist Roland Zoss, and editor Giulio Einaudi.  Their perceptions brought the island into the focus of modern tourism.

People
 John Bonica (born 1917), anesthesiologist and professional wrestler 
 Roland Zoss (born 1951), novelist and composer

See also
List of volcanoes in Italy
 List of islands of Italy

References

External links
 
Private page of a novelist living on Filicudi
A commercial touristic website about Filicudi
Info about the island
Filicudi Society of Waltham Massachusetts

Aeolian Islands
Frazioni of the Metropolitan City of Messina
Stratovolcanoes of Italy
Pleistocene stratovolcanoes